The 2015 Barcelona City Council election, also the 2015 Barcelona municipal election, was held on Sunday, 24 May 2015, to elect the 10th City Council of the municipality of Barcelona. All 41 seats in the City Council were up for election. The election was held simultaneously with regional elections in thirteen autonomous communities and local elections all throughout Spain.

The election was won by the Barcelona en Comú (BComú) citizen platform, supported by Podemos, Initiative for Catalonia Greens–United and Alternative Left (ICV–EUiA) and Constituent Process (Procés Constituent) and led by Ada Colau popular activist and former spokeswoman of the Platform for People Affected by Mortgages (PAH).  Incumbent mayor Xavier Trias of the Convergence and Union (CiU) federation, who had campaigned for a second consecutive term in office, saw his support reduced from 14 to 10 out of 41 seats in the council. Citizens (C's) became the third largest political force in the city, whereas Republican Left of Catalonia (ERC) obtained its second best historical result. On the other hand, both the Socialists' Party of Catalonia (PSC) and the People's Party (PP) were severely mauled. The PSC, which had won every municipal election in Barcelona and had controlled the local government up until 2011, fell to fifth place and below 10% of the share, while the PP achieved its worst result since the People's Alliance (AP) result in the 1987 election. The Popular Unity Candidacy (CUP) also entered the City Council for the first time in history, winning 3 seats and 7.4% of the votes.

Colau went on to become the first female mayor of Barcelona in history with the support of the BComú, ERC, the PSC and one of the CUP councillors.

Electoral system
The City Council of Barcelona was the top-tier administrative and governing body of the municipality of Barcelona, composed of the mayor, the government council and the elected plenary assembly. Elections to the local councils in Spain were fixed for the fourth Sunday of May every four years.

Voting for the local assembly was on the basis of universal suffrage, which comprised all nationals over 18 years of age, registered and residing in the municipality of Barcelona and in full enjoyment of their political rights, as well as resident non-national European citizens and those whose country of origin allowed Spanish nationals to vote in their own elections by virtue of a treaty. Local councillors were elected using the D'Hondt method and a closed list proportional representation, with an electoral threshold of five percent of valid votes—which included blank ballots—being applied in each local council. Councillors were allocated to municipal councils based on the following scale:

The mayor was indirectly elected by the plenary assembly. A legal clause required that mayoral candidates earned the vote of an absolute majority of councillors, or else the candidate of the most-voted party in the assembly was to be automatically appointed to the post. In the event of a tie, the appointee would be determined by lot.

Parties and candidates
The electoral law allowed for parties and federations registered in the interior ministry, coalitions and groupings of electors to present lists of candidates. Parties and federations intending to form a coalition ahead of an election were required to inform the relevant Electoral Commission within ten days of the election call, whereas groupings of electors needed to secure the signature of a determined amount of the electors registered in the municipality for which they sought election, disallowing electors from signing for more than one list of candidates. For the case of Barcelona, as its population was over 1,000,001, at least 8,000 signatures were required.

Below is a list of the main parties and electoral alliances which contested the election:

Opinion polls
The table below lists voting intention estimates in reverse chronological order, showing the most recent first and using the dates when the survey fieldwork was done, as opposed to the date of publication. Where the fieldwork dates are unknown, the date of publication is given instead. The highest percentage figure in each polling survey is displayed with its background shaded in the leading party's colour. If a tie ensues, this is applied to the figures with the highest percentages. The "Lead" column on the right shows the percentage-point difference between the parties with the highest percentages in a poll. When available, seat projections determined by the polling organisations are displayed below (or in place of) the percentages in a smaller font; 21 seats were required for an absolute majority in the City Council of Barcelona.

Results

Notes

References
Opinion poll sources

Other

Barcelona
2015
2010s in Barcelona
2015 in Catalonia